Daniel Atwood McGrew (April 7, 1937 – November 7, 2019) was an American football center.

Purdue University
During his college years, McGrew was a center at Purdue University.

NFL
McGrew was drafted by the Detroit Lions in 1959, but in the following year was taken by the Buffalo Bills during their inaugural season, when he played in all 14 games and was their starting center. Although he ended up as an All-AFL 2nd team member, he was replaced the following year by rookie Al Bemiller and never played in another game in the NFL.

Semi-pro
McGrew went on to play on the semi-pro level with the Wheeling Ironmen. On June 13, 2009, McGrew was one of eight new members in the 29th class to be inducted into the Minor Pro Football Hall of Fame.

High school coaching
McGrew later coached football on the high school level. He coached at Chipticon High School where his team won a SMAC championship. During this time, he was a ninth grade gym teacher, retiring from Weir High School after the 1998–99 school year.

References

1937 births
2019 deaths
American football centers
American Football League players
Buffalo Bills players
Purdue Boilermakers football players
High school football coaches in West Virginia
People from Martins Ferry, Ohio
Players of American football from Ohio